Southeastern University most often refers to:
Southeastern University (Florida) in Lakeland, Florida, USA

Southeastern University may also refer to:
Nova Southeastern University in Davie, Florida
Southeastern Baptist College in Laurel, Mississippi
Southeastern Baptist Theological Seminary in Wake Forest, North Carolina
Southeastern Bible College in Birmingham, Alabama
Southeastern Free Will Baptist College in Wendell, North Carolina
Southeastern Illinois College in Harrisburg, Illinois
Southeastern Louisiana University in Hammond, Louisiana
Southeastern Oklahoma State University in Durant, Oklahoma
Southeastern Technical College in Vidalia, Georgia
Southeastern University (Washington, D.C.)
Nanjing University, formerly National Southeastern University, in Nanjing, Jiangsu, China
University of Southeastern Philippines in Davao City

See also
Southeast University (disambiguation)